All of Me is a 1934 American pre-Code drama film directed by James Flood and starring Fredric March, Miriam Hopkins, and George Raft. The film was written by actor Thomas Mitchell and Sidney Buchman from Rose Porter's play Chrysalis.

Plot
A professor tires of the direction his life is going and wants to move west, but his girlfriend doesn't understand why he is so dissatisfied.

Cast
Fredric March as Don Ellis
Miriam Hopkins as Lydia Darrow
George Raft as Honey Rogers
Helen Mack as Eve Haron
Nella Walker as Mrs. Darrow
William Collier, Sr. as Jerry Helman
Gilbert Emery as Dean
Blanche Friderici as Miss Haskell
Edgar Kennedy as Guard
Jason Robards, Sr. as Man in Speakeasy
Barton MacLane as First Cop
Kitty Kelly as Lorraine

Production
The film was based on a play by Rose Porter called Chrysalis. It debuted in summer theatre in 1932.

In April 1933 Paramount announced the cast would include Raft, March and Hopkins. The following month Sylvia Sidney joined the cast and the movie was going to be called Desire.

Raft was fighting with Paramount and for a while it seemed he may leave the studio but in June they confirmed he would make the film after The Bowery.

Carole Lombard replaced Sidney. Then she dropped out and was replaced by Helen Mack.

Filming took place in October and November 1933 under the title Chrysalis.

Reception
Reviews were poor and the film was a box office flop.

The Los Angeles Times said it had "an almost hopeless plot." Filmink magazine said "a contemporary critic wondered if the reels had been accidentally swapped around and it feels like that when you watch the movie today."

References

External links

 

1934 films
1934 drama films
American drama films
American black-and-white films
1930s English-language films
American films based on plays
Paramount Pictures films
Films directed by James Flood
Films with screenplays by Sidney Buchman
1930s American films